Karl Gauti Hjaltason is an Icelandic politician who was a member of Althing from 2017 to 2021. Formerly, he was a part of People's Party of Iceland.

Life and career
Hjaltason was born in 1959 in Reykjavík, Iceland. He earned a degree in management from Endurmenntun Háskóla Íslands.

Between 1985 and 1998, Hjaltason was the chairman of the Icelandic Karate Association.

In 2012, he founded Vestmannaeyjar Astronomical Society where he served as a chairman until 2014.

References

Living people
1959 births
Karl Gauti Hjaltason
Karl Gauti Hjaltason
Karl Gauti Hjaltason